Christman Bird and Wildlife Sanctuary is a national historic district located near Delanson, Schenectady County, New York. The district includes six contributing buildings and one contributing structure on a largely wooded, rural  tract.  It lies in the valley of the Bozenkill and includes a  waterfall along the Helderberg Escarpment.  Located on the property is a two-story frame dwelling built in 1868, a stone dairy house, barns, large stone walls, and an open lean-to built by the Mohawk Valley Hiking Club.  The sanctuary had its beginnings in 1888 when property owner W.W. Christman (1865-1937) and his wife, the former Catherine Bradt, began a winter bird feeding program during the great blizzard of that year.

It was listed on the National Register of Historic Places in 1970.

Gallery

External links
 Local Hikes Info

References

Historic districts on the National Register of Historic Places in New York (state)
Bird sanctuaries of the United States
National Register of Historic Places in Schenectady County, New York